Darren Smith (21 September 1972 – 17 November 1992) was an Australian cyclist. He competed in the individual road race at the 1992 Summer Olympics. He was killed in a road accident just months after the Olympics.

References

External links
 

1972 births
1992 deaths
Australian male cyclists
Olympic cyclists of Australia
Cyclists at the 1992 Summer Olympics
Place of birth missing
Road incident deaths in Queensland
Cycling road incident deaths